Sherlock Holmes (a.k.a. Conan Doyle's Master Detective Sherlock Holmes) is a 1932 American Pre-Code film starring Clive Brook as the eponymous London detective. The movie is based on the successful stage play Sherlock Holmes by William Gillette, in turn based on the stories by Arthur Conan Doyle, and is directed by William K. Howard for the Fox Film Corporation. Brook had played Holmes previously in The Return of Sherlock Holmes and the "Murder Will Out" segment of Paramount on Parade.

Reginald Owen plays Dr. Watson, and Ernest Torrence is Holmes's arch-rival, Professor Moriarty. Reginald Owen played Sherlock Holmes the following year in A Study in Scarlet. Owen is one of a small number of actors to play both Holmes and Watson. Examples of other such actors include Jeremy Brett, who played Watson on stage in the United States and, most famously, Holmes on British television, Carleton Hobbs, who played both roles in British radio adaptations, and Patrick Macnee, who played both roles in US television movies.

Cast
 Clive Brook	... 	Sherlock Holmes
 Miriam Jordan	... 	Alice Faulkner
 Ernest Torrence	... 	Moriarty
 Herbert Mundin	... 	George
 Reginald Owen	... 	Dr. Watson
 Howard Leeds          ...     Little Billy 
 Alan Mowbray	... 	Colonel Gore-King
 C. Montague Shaw	... 	Judge
 Frank Atkinson	... 	Man in Bar
 Ivan F. Simpson	... 	Faulkner
 Stanley Fields	... 	Tony Ardetti

Uncredited:
Ted Billings - Carnival Thug
Roy D'Arcy - Manuel Lopez
Edward Dillon - Al
John George - Bird Shop Thug
Robert Graves - Gaston Roux
Lew Hicks - Prison Guard
Brandon Hurst - Secretary to Erskine
Claude King - Sir Albert Hastings
Arnold Lucy - Chaplain
Lucien Prival - Hans Dreiaugen

References

External links

Sherlock Holmes; allmovie.com synopsis

1932 films
Sherlock Holmes films
American films based on plays
Fox Film films
Films directed by William K. Howard
1930s thriller films
American black-and-white films
Films set in London
American thriller films
1930s English-language films
1930s American films